The 15 cm schwere Feldhaubitze 1902 was a German heavy field howitzer cannon introduced in 1903 and served in World War I.

Design and history
It was the first artillery piece to use a modern recoil system in the German Army. Some 416 were in service at the beginning of the World War I. Its mobility, which allowed it to be deployed as medium artillery, and fairly heavy shell gave the German army a firepower advantage in the early battles in Belgium and France in 1914 as the French and British armies lacked an equivalent. France had a Canon de 65 M with a recoil system, but used it only as a mountain howitzer.

See also
 15 cm sFH 13 : German successor

Weapons of comparable role, performance and era
 15 cm schwere Feldhaubitze M 94: Austro-Hungarian equivalent
 BL 6 inch 30 cwt howitzer: British equivalent
 Rimailho Model 1904TR : French equivalent
 152 mm howitzer M1910 : French/Russian equivalent
 6 inch field howitzer M-1908 : approximate US equivalent

Notes

References
 General Sir Martin Farndale, History of the Royal Regiment of Artillery. Western Front 1914–1918. The Royal Artillery Institution, 1986. .
 Jäger, Herbert. German Artillery of World War One. Ramsbury, Marlborough, Wiltshire: Crowood Press, 2001. .

External links

 Lovett Artillery Collection
 
 List and pictures of World War I surviving 15cm sFH 02 howitzers

150 mm artillery
World War I artillery of Germany
World War I howitzers